Boissy-sans-Avoir is a commune in the Yvelines department in north-central France.

It is the burial place of actress Romy Schneider (1938-1982) and her son David (1966-1981).

See also
Communes of the Yvelines department

References

Communes of Yvelines